Berkeleydione is a chemical compound isolated from a Penicillium species that has in vitro activity in a cancer cell line. It was first discovered in fungal species which evolved to live in an acidic lake at Berkeley Pit.

Notes

Lactones
Diketones
Heterocyclic compounds with 4 rings
Vinylidene compounds